Ozothamnus vauvilliersii is a species of shrub in the family Asteraceae.

References

vauvilliersii
Plants described in 1853